Stadio Gaetano Bonolis (also known as Stadio di Piano d'Accio) is a multi-use stadium in Piano d'Accio frazione, in Teramo, Italy. It is currently used mostly for football matches and concerts. It is the home ground of Teramo Calcio.  The stadium holds 7,498.

The stadium is named after Gaetano Bonolis, a medical doctor of the club as a posthumous honour.

References 

Comunale
S.S. Teramo Calcio